Katariasar is a village in Bikaner district, Rajasthan, India. The village is inhabited by the Jasnathjis. According to the 2011 census of India, the village had a population of 3,554 people (1,849 males; 1,705 females).

Attractions
Jasnath Temple

References

Villages in Bikaner district

External links
उमड़ा श्रद्धा का सैलाब, धधकते अंगारों पर थिरके अनुयायी राजस्थान पत्रिका